General Electric Automation and Controls division combines what was formerly known as GE Intelligent Platforms and Alstom's Power Automation and Controls.  In 2019, GE Intelligent Platforms was acquired by Emerson Electric and is now called Machine Automation Solutions.

GE Automation and Controls produce Programmable Logic Controller (PLC) and Programmable Automation Controller (PAC) based control systems, I/O, and field devices, including support to design, commissioning and operate industrial assets and operations. Industries served include manufacturing, food and beverage, life sciences, power, oil and gas, mining and metals, water and wastewater, and specialty machinery industries.

History
In 1986, GE Fanuc Automation Corporation was jointly established in the US by FANUC and General Electric (GE). Under the joint venture company, three operating companies, GE Fanuc Automation North America, Inc., in the U.S., GE Fanuc Automation Europe S.A. in Luxembourg, and Fanuc GE Automation Asia Ltd. in Japan were established (the Asian company was established in 1987).

In 2007, the company was renamed to GE Fanuc Intelligent Platforms (and GE Fanuc Automation Solutions Europe SA became GE Fanuc Intelligent Platforms Europe SA). GE Fanuc Automation CNC Europe changed its name to Fanuc GE CNC Europe.

In 2009, GE and Fanuc agreed to dissolve joint venture and the software, controls and embedded business became part of GE, under the new name GE Intelligent Platforms.

In 2015, GE Intelligent Platforms, Inc. changed its name to Automation & Controls upon acquisition of Alstom's Power Automation & Controls business.

In 2018, amidst restructuring plans for the whole General Electric group, it was announced that Emerson Electric was to acquire Intelligent Platforms, and the deal was completed on February 1, 2019.

Acquisitions

 1998: completed acquisition of AFE Technologies (first purchased 70% in late 1996) 
 1998: acquired Total Control Products
 2000: acquired DataViews Corp 
 2001: acquired VMIC
 2002: acquired Intellution, Inc.
 2003: acquired RAMiX
 2003: acquired Mountain Systems, Inc.
 2006: acquired (technology assets of) Condor Engineering
 2006: acquired SBS Technologies
 2006: acquired Radstone Technology PLC
 2008: acquired process technology assets from MTL Instruments Group
 2011: acquired SmartSignal, Inc
 2011: acquired technology assets of CSense Systems (Pty) Ltd.
 2015: acquired Alstom Power Automation & Controls
 2015: sold its embedded systems division to Veritas Capital, now known as Abaco Systems
 2019: acquired by Emerson Electric

References

External links

1987 establishments in Virginia
2019 disestablishments in Virginia
2019 mergers and acquisitions
Albemarle County, Virginia
American companies disestablished in 2019
American companies established in 1987
Computer companies disestablished in 2019
Computer companies established in 1987
Defunct computer companies of the United States
Defunct software companies of the United States
Former General Electric subsidiaries
Industrial automation
MES software
Software companies based in Virginia
Software companies established in 1987
Software companies disestablished in 2019